Of a Boy (What The Birds See in the UK and US) is a 2002 novel by Sonya Hartnett about a lonely and troubled youth. 

The omnipresent narrator follows the plight of nine-year-old Adrian in his suburban life in 1977. At age eight, his parents separated and he was taken away from his Mother Sookie as she was "unfit to care for him". He therefore lives with his Grandmother Beattie and Uncle Rory. Adrian spends his days thinking of things that unsettle him such as sea monsters and growing purple hair. One of the things that most disturb him is the fact that three children, surnamed Metford, disappear from a neighborhood near his around the beginning of the book.

Shortly after the disappearance of the Metford children, a twelve-year-old girl called Nicole moves in across the street from Adrian. She has no friends and doesn't attend school, but she mystifies Adrian and he soon becomes obsessed with her as he loses his only friend Clinton. The novel ends tragically with Adrian and Nicole falling beneath a pool cover (while trying to find the abducted children) in winter and being unable to break through to the air. The story ends with Adrian's grandmother believing him to be abducted, just as the Metford children.

Awards
winner of the 2003 The Age Book of the Year
winner of the 2003 Commonwealth Writers Prize (South East Asia and South Pacific Region, Best Book)
shortlisted for the 2003 Miles Franklin Award
shortlisted for the 2003 New South Wales Premier's Literary Awards

Novels by Sonya Hartnett
2002 Australian novels
Viking Press books